NaLyssa Smith (born August 8, 2000) is an American professional basketball player for the Indiana Fever of the Women's National Basketball Association (WNBA). She played college basketball for Baylor, winning the NCAA Division I Championship in 2019 and the Wade Trophy in 2021. She was drafted second overall by the Fever in the 2022 WNBA draft.

Early life and high school career
Smith grew up in San Antonio and played at East Central High School, averaging 23.4 points, 13.7 rebounds, and 3.4 blocks per game as a senior. A five-star recruit and the no. 3 recruit by ESPN, Smith committed to playing college basketball at Baylor over schools such as South Carolina, Ohio State, and Louisville.

College career

Freshman year
As a freshman, Smith came off the bench for the Lady Bears and provided steady minutes. Baylor coach Kim Mulkey praised Smith and said that she won many games for the Bears during their national championship season because opposing teams were too focused on the team's star players Lauren Cox and Kalani Brown. In the national championship game, she came off the bench to replace an injured Cox and put up eight points and four rebounds to help Baylor win against Notre Dame.

Sophomore year
Smith was promoted into the starting lineup in her sophomore year and improved on her production, averaging 14.3 points and 8 rebounds en route to earning first-team All-Big 12. She also led the Lady Bears in double-doubles with 11.

Junior year
Smith continued to improve, averaging a near double-double and winning Big 12 Player of the Year.

In the NCAA tournament, Smith scored 24 points in the Lady Bears' Sweet Sixteen match against Michigan and tied a tournament record for most field goals made without a miss with 11.

Smith's stellar season garnered her a number of awards, such as the Wade Trophy, the Katrina McClain Award, and All-American honors from the Associated Press, Women's Basketball Coaches Association, and the United States Basketball Writers Association.

Professional career
On April 11, 2022, Smith was drafted second overall by the Indiana Fever in the 2022 WNBA draft.

WNBA career statistics

Regular season

|-
| align="left" | 2022
| align="left" | Indiana
| 32 || 32 || 30.7 || .419 || .381 || .618 || 7.9 || 1.4 || 0.5 || 0.3 || 2.4 || 13.5
|-
| align="left" | Career
| align="left" | 1 year, 1 team
| 32 || 32 || 30.7 || .419 || .381 || .618 || 7.9 || 1.4 || 0.5 || 0.3 || 2.4 || 13.5

National team career
Smith was a member of the United States women's national under-18 basketball team at the 2018 FIBA Americas U18 Championship, helping them win the gold medal in Mexico City. She was set to represent the United States women's national under-19 basketball team at the 2019 FIBA Under-19 Women's Basketball World Cup, but withdrew due to injury concerns.

Career statistics

College

|-
| style="text-align:left;" | 2018–19
| style="text-align:left;" | Baylor
| 38 || 1 || 15.3 || .543 || .111 || .681 || 5.1 || 0.4 || 0.4 || 0.4 || 0.9 || 8.4
|-
| style="text-align:left;" | 2019–20
| style="text-align:left;" | Baylor
| 28 || 27 || 24.1 || .586 || .000 || .746 || 8.0 || 0.6 || 0.9 || 0.6 || 1.7 || 14.3 
|-
| style="text-align:left;" | 2020–21
| style="text-align:left;" | Baylor
| 31 || 31 || 30.5 || .561 || .214 || .792 || 8.9 || 1.2 || 1.2 || 0.8 || 2.8 || 18.0
|-
| style="text-align:left;" | 2021–22
| style="text-align:left;" | Baylor
| 35 || 35 || 32.9 || .550 || .237 || .795 || 11.5 || 1.1 || 0.7 || 1.1 || 2.5 || 22.1
|-
| style="text-align:center;" colspan=2 | Career
| 132 || 94 || 25.4 || .558	 || .200 || .768 || 8.3 || 0.8 || 0.8 || 0.7 || 1.9 || 15.5

Personal life
Smith is the daughter of Rodney and Nikki Smith. Rodney was a basketball player at UTSA and her brother Rodney Jr. played soccer at the University of Saint Mary.

References

External links
 Baylor Lady Bears profile
 USA Basketball profile

2000 births
Living people
American women's basketball players
Basketball players from San Antonio
LGBT basketball players
LGBT people from Texas
Lesbian sportswomen
Power forwards (basketball)
Baylor Bears women's basketball players
All-American college women's basketball players
Indiana Fever draft picks
Indiana Fever players